"Lady Florence Craye Arrives in New York" is the second episode of the fourth series of the 1990s British comedy television series Jeeves and Wooster. It is also called "The Once and Future Ex".

In the US, it was one of five episodes of Jeeves and Wooster that were not aired as part of the original broadcast of the television series on Masterpiece Theatre, though all episodes were made available on US home video releases. "Chuffy" aired as the second episode of the fourth series of Jeeves and Wooster instead.

Background 
Adapted from Joy in the Morning.

Cast
 Bertie Wooster – Hugh Laurie
 Jeeves – Stephen Fry
 Stilton Cheesewright – Nicholas Palliser
 Florence Craye – Francesca Folan
 George Caffyn – Nigel Whitmey
 Zenobia "Nobby" Hopwood – Jennifer Gibson
 Lord Worplesdon – Frederick Treves
 Chichester Clam – John Cater
 Corrigan – Sam Douglas
 Liftman Coneybear – Joseph Mydell
 Secretary – Thomasine Heiner

Plot

Bertie bumps into his former fiancée Lady Florence in a bookshop while buying a birthday present for Jeeves. But after a row with her present suitor, the insanely jealous D'Arcy "Stilton" Cheesewright she renews her engagement to Bertie. Friend George Caffyn needs $50,000 for his play but can only get it from Chichester Clam when he sells his boats to Lord Worplesdon, but the press pack haunting them is stopping the deal from going through. Jeeves sees a fancy dress party as a way of sorting everything out.

See also
 List of Jeeves and Wooster characters

References

External links

Jeeves and Wooster episodes
1993 British television episodes
Television episodes set in New York City